Brian Kevin Fitzpatrick (born December 17, 1973) is an American attorney and politician who is a Republican member of the U.S. House of Representatives, serving as the representative for Pennsylvania's 1st congressional district since 2017. The district, numbered as the 8th district during his first term, includes all of Bucks County, a mostly suburban county north of Philadelphia, as well as a sliver of Montgomery County.

A former FBI agent, Fitzpatrick was elected in 2016. After a court-mandated redistricting of Pennsylvania's congressional districts in 2018, Fitzpatrick has been reelected ever since to the redrawn 1st district.

Early life and education
Born in Philadelphia and raised in nearby Levittown, Pennsylvania, Fitzpatrick graduated from Bishop Egan High School in Fairless Hills in 1992. He graduated from La Salle University in 1996 with a Bachelor of Science in Business Administration. In 2001, Fitzpatrick completed both a Master of Business Administration at Pennsylvania State University and a Juris Doctor at the Penn State Dickinson School of Law.

Career
Fitzpatrick is a former Special Assistant United States Attorney and Federal Bureau of Investigation (FBI) supervisory special agent in California. At the FBI, he served as a national supervisor for the Bureau's Public Corruption Unit, and led the agency's Campaign Finance and Election Crimes Enforcement program. During his time in the FBI, he spent time in Kyiv, Ukraine; Mosul, Iraq; and Washington, D.C. He was embedded with U.S. Special Forces as part of Operation Iraqi Freedom.

U.S. House of Representatives

Elections

2016
In 2016, Fitzpatrick ran for the open U.S. House seat of his brother Mike Fitzpatrick, who retired from Congress to uphold a promise to limit himself to four terms.

In the April 26, 2016, Republican primary, Fitzpatrick received 78.4% of the vote, defeating Andy Warren and Marc Duome. State Representative Steve Santarsiero defeated Shaughnessy Naughton for the Democratic nomination, 59.8% to 40.2%. Fitzpatrick won the general election with 54.4% of the vote to Santarsiero's 45.6%.

2018
After a court-ordered redistricting, Fitzpatrick's district was renumbered the 1st district. It remained largely unchanged from the old 8th, but absorbed a larger slice of central Montgomery County. According to Nate Cohn of The New York Times, "the old 8th had been one of the more regularly drawn districts in a map that had been thrown out as an unconstitutional partisan Republican gerrymander. The new 1st was slightly more Democratic than its predecessor. Had it existed in 2016, Hillary Clinton would have carried it with 49% of the vote to Donald Trump's 47%. In contrast, Clinton and Trump finished almost tied in the old 8th, with Trump winning by 0.2 percentage points."

In the Republican primary on May 15, 2018, Fitzpatrick defeated Dean Malik, 68.85% to 31.15%. Scott Wallace won the Democratic primary with 55.97% of the vote. In the general election, Fitzpatrick defeated Wallace, 51.3% to 48.7%. He carried Bucks County by 12,000 votes, more than his overall margin of 8,300 votes. Fitzpatrick thus became one of only three Republican U.S. representatives to survive during the 2018 U.S. House elections in congressional districts that Democratic presidential nominee Hillary Clinton carried in 2016, along with John Katko and Will Hurd.

2020
Fitzpatrick ran for a third term in 2020. In the Republican primary, he defeated Andrew Meehan, who ran as a more conservative candidate and a staunch supporter of President Donald Trump. The Democratic nominee was Ivyland City Councilwoman Christina Finello. Fitzpatrick was considered potentially vulnerable because his district had voted for Clinton in 2016, but he was reelected by a margin of 13 percentage points even as Democratic presidential nominee Joe Biden won Pennsylvania and carried the district by 6 points. He was one of nine House Republicans to win in a district carried by Biden.

Tenure
In the first session of the 115th United States Congress, Fitzpatrick was ranked the third most bipartisan member of the House of Representatives by the Bipartisan Index, a metric created by The Lugar Center and Georgetown's McCourt School of Public Policy to assess congressional bipartisanship. In the first session of the 116th United States Congress, Fitzpatrick was ranked first by the Bipartisan Index. GovTrack noted that Fitzpatrick introduced the most bills among freshman Representatives, and, of the 274 bills he cosponsored, 35% were introduced by a non-Republican legislator.

On February 4, 2021, Fitzpatrick joined 10 other Republican House members voting with all voting Democrats to strip Marjorie Taylor Greene of her Education and Labor Committee and Budget Committee assignments in response to controversial political statements she had made. On November 5, 2021, Fitzpatrick was among the 13 House Republicans who broke with their party and voted with a majority of Democrats for the Infrastructure Investment and Jobs Act, a $1.2 trillion infrastructure spending bill.

Abortion 
Fitzpatrick has aligned himself with anti-abortion stances. While abortion is not mentioned on his website, he co-signed a letter to President Donald Trump in 2019 that requested Trump veto any efforts to weaken anti-abortion policies. In 2017, he voted for the Pain-Capable Unborn Child Protection Act, which would prohibit abortions performed after 20 weeks of pregnancy, except in situations of incest or rape. Fitzpatrick voted against the Women's Health Protection Act of 2021, which aimed to protect health-care professionals by establishing a statutory right for them to provide abortions.

After the U.S. Supreme Court decided Dobbs v. Jackson Women's Health Organization, allowing states to ban abortion, Fitzpatrick said in a statement to state legislatures, "Any legislative consideration must always seek to achieve bipartisan consensus that both respects a woman’s privacy and autonomy, and also respects the sanctity of human life. These principles are not mutually exclusive; both can and must be achieved."

Fitzpatrick was one of three Republicans to vote for H.R. 8297: Ensuring Access to Abortion Act of 2022.

Fitzpatrick also voted for H.R. 8373: The Right to Contraception Act. This bill was designed "to protect a person’s ability to access contraceptives and to engage in contraception, and to protect a health care provider’s ability to provide contraceptives, contraception, and information related to contraception".

Big Tech 
In 2022, Fitzpatrick was one of 39 Republicans to vote for the Merger Filing Fee Modernization Act of 2022, an antitrust package that would crack down on corporations for anti-competitive behavior.

Climate change 
At a September 2018 forum hosted by the Bipartisan Policy Center and The Hill, Fitzpatrick highlighted man-made climate change as a serious issue, saying that Republicans must "acknowledge reality and [not] deny it." He is a member of the bipartisan congressional Climate Solutions Caucus and cointroduced the Energy Innovation and Carbon Dividend Act of 2018, which would impose a carbon tax with net revenue returned to households as a rebate. He did not sponsor the 2019 version of the bill.

As of 2022, Fitzpatrick has a lifetime score of 74% on the National Environmental Scorecard of the League of Conservation Voters, and is ranked as the most environmentally friendly Republican member of the House, rating higher than three Democrats.

Gerrymandering 
In September 2017, Fitzpatrick urged the U.S. Supreme Court to limit extreme partisan gerrymandering in Gill v. Whitford. He stressed that partisan redistricting had undermined the Founding Fathers' vision of the House of Representatives as the voice of the people.

Fitzpatrick was the only Republican member of Congress from Pennsylvania not to take part in a February 2018 lawsuit challenging a new district map drawn by Democrats. He explained that he opposes the drawing of congressional districts by elected officials of either party, saying instead that they should be drawn by independent, nonpartisan citizen panels.

Gun policy 
In 2018, Fitzpatrick was the only Republican endorsed by the Giffords Law Center to Prevent Gun Violence, the gun control organization founded by former U.S. Representative Gabby Giffords. He voted to expand background checks and restrict assault weapon sales. He voted against a bill that would require states to recognize concealed-carry permits issued by other states.

In March 2021, Fitzpatrick was one of eight Republicans to join the House majority in passing the Bipartisan Background Checks Act of 2021.

On July 29, 2022, Fitzpatrick and one other Republican, Chris Jacobs, joined the Democrats in voting for a bill banning assault weapons.

In the 2022 midterm elections, Fitzpatrick was the only Republican member of Congress to receive an F rating from the NRA.

Health care 
Fitzpatrick opposed the American Health Care Act, a bill to repeal and replace the Patient Protection and Affordable Care Act. In a statement, he said, "After considering the current healthcare bill in a thorough and deliberate manner, I have concluded that, although the American Health Care Act focuses on several much-needed reforms to our healthcare system, in its current form I cannot support this legislation". Fitzpatrick joined many of his Republican colleagues as well as every congressional Democrat in opposing the bill.

On May 4, 2017, Fitzpatrick also voted against the second attempt to pass the American Health Care Act. In a statement, he said, "We saw what happened when healthcare reform – an issue impacting 1/5 of our economy – was rushed through Congress along extremely partisan lines in 2009," referring to the ACA in 2010. On December 12, he took part in the Democratic bill to lower drug costs, the Elijah Cummings Lower Drug Costs Now Act.

Immigration 
In 2017, Fitzpatrick was critical of President Obama's executive order establishing the DACA program, but said the immigration system was broken. In a 2018 debate, he said he supported a path to citizenship for DREAMers, but that "any immigration reform package has to deal with border security." In 2019, he voted for the American Dream and Promise Act, which included no new border security measures.

Fitzpatrick opposed Trump's 2017 executive order to impose a temporary ban on entry to the U.S. to citizens of seven Muslim-majority countries, saying, "the president's policy entirely misses the mark."

LGBT rights 
Fitzpatrick supports same-sex marriage. In 2019, he co-sponsored and voted for the Equality Act, which would extend anti-discrimination protections to LGBT-identifying adults and minors and repeal Title IX; seven other House Republicans joined him in voting for it and it passed the House 236-173. He was one of three Republicans to vote for it in 2021 when it again passed the House.

In 2022, Fitzpatrick was one of six Republicans to vote for the Global Respect Act, which sanctions foreign persons responsible for violations of internationally recognized human rights against lesbian, gay, bisexual, transgender, queer, and intersex (LGBTQI) individuals, and for other purposes.

On July 19, 2022, Fitzpatrick and 46 other Republican representatives voted for the Respect for Marriage Act, which would codify the right to same-sex marriage in federal law.

Narcotics trafficking
Fitzpatrick sponsored the International Narcotics Trafficking Emergency Response by Detecting Incoming Contraband with Technology (INTERDICT) Act, which Trump signed into law in January 2018. The law directs $15 million to U.S. Customs and Border Patrol to expand screening for fentanyl and opioids at the U.S. border.

Donald Trump
In July 2019, Fitzpatrick was one of four Republican House members to vote in support of a motion to condemn remarks Trump made on Twitter calling on "'Progressive' Democrat Congresswomen who originally came from countries" that are described as failing to "go back and help fix the totally broken and crime infested places from which they came."

Fitzpatrick voted against Trump's impeachment on December 18, 2019, and again on January 13, 2021. Before the second vote, he introduced a censure resolution against Trump, which condemned the rhetoric that led to the Capitol attack.

On May 19, 2021, Fitzpatrick was one of 35 Republicans to join all Democrats in voting to approve legislation to establish the January 6 commission meant to investigate the storming of the U.S. Capitol. He was reportedly the only House Republican to attend a 2023 ceremony marking the second anniversary of the Capitol attack. Fitzpatrick called the attack a "terrible day that we can never let happen again."

Russia
In a 2018 debate, Fitzpatrick said that Russia held "by and large sinister motives", noting that while he was stationed in Ukraine, Russia twice attempted to knock out Ukraine's electrical grids through cyber attacks.

In July 2018, Fitzpatrick said that Russian leader Vladimir Putin had "manipulated" Trump at the Helsinki Summit. Fitzpatrick said he was "frankly sickened by the exchange" between Trump and Putin. He criticized the "mixed signals" that the Trump administration was sending regarding Russian interference in the 2016 election.

In April 2018, Fitzpatrick said that Trump should stop attacking the FBI and allow Robert Mueller to complete his investigation, saying it was improper to "judge an institution based on the actions of a few bad actors."

Taxes 
In December 2017, Fitzpatrick voted for the Tax Cuts and Jobs Act in a party-line vote.

Term limits and congressional perks
In April 2018, Fitzpatrick led a bipartisan group of freshmen House members in an Oval Office meeting at which they discussed with Trump a proposed constitutional amendment imposing congressional term limits.

In May 2018, Fitzpatrick and Stephanie Murphy introduced H.R. 5946, the Fostering Accountability, Integrity, Trust, and Honor (FAITH) in Congress Act, which would "end certain special perks reserved for Members of Congress, enact a lifetime ban preventing former Members of Congress from becoming lobbyists, and withhold Members' paychecks if they fail to pass a budget on time."

Steve Bannon
On October 21, 2021, Fitzpatrick was one of nine House Republicans to vote to hold Steve Bannon in contempt of Congress.

Committee assignments
 Committee on Ways and Means 
 Subcommittee on Health
 Subcommittee on Oversight and Investigations
 Permanent Select Committee on Intelligence 
 Subcommittee on National Intelligence, Chairman
 Subcommittee Defense Intelligence and Space Force
Former:
 Committee on Foreign Affairs
 Subcommittee on Middle East, North Africa, and International Terrorism
 Subcommittee on Europe, Eurasia, Energy, and the Environment
  Committee on Transportation and Infrastructure 
 Subcommittee on Aviation
 Subcommittee on Highways and Transit
 Subcommittee on Railroads, Pipelines, and Hazardous Materials

References

External links

 Congressman Brian Fitzpatrick official U.S. House website
 Brian Fitzpatrick for Congress official campaign website
 
 
 

|-

|-

|-

1973 births
21st-century American politicians
Dickinson School of Law alumni
Federal Bureau of Investigation agents
La Salle University alumni
Living people
People from Levittown, Pennsylvania
Pennsylvania lawyers
Smeal College of Business alumni
Politicians from Philadelphia
Republican Party members of the United States House of Representatives from Pennsylvania
American gun control activists